The Süleyman Demirel University Research Hospital (SDU Research Hospital) is a research and teaching hospital located on the
Süleyman Demirel University campus.

The hospital was founded in 1994 and transferred to its current building in 2000. The new building cost 37148000 USD. The SDU research hospital is a part of the Suleyman Demirel Hospital Network.

References

Hospital buildings completed in 1994
Hospitals established in 1994
Teaching hospitals in Turkey
Süleyman Demirel University